"What's Next" is a song by Canadian rapper Drake. It was released on March 5, 2021, as a single from Drake's fourth EP Scary Hours 2, through Republic Records and OVO Sound.

With the song's debut at the top of the US Billboard Hot 100, it became Drake's ninth US number-one single in the country. Additionally, it became his fourth song to debut atop the chart.

Background
An earlier version of the song surfaced on the internet on February 27, 2021. It was noted that various lines of the song resembled those of on an unreleased track with Young Thug titled "What a Time to Be a Slime". On March 3, 2021, Drake took to his social media to announce the release of his upcoming EP Scary Hours 2 on March 5, as well as the return of OVO Sound Radio the next day. The song was released as track one of the EP.

In May 2021, rapper Baby Keem revealed he was originally intended to be featured on the single alongside American rapper Playboi Carti (who Drake would later work with on the track Pain 1993. In the early morning of September 4th, 2021, a day after the release of Drake's Certified Lover Boy, Drake premiered the original version of What's Next with Baby Keem on his radio show. The original version includes all vocals from the released version, with an additional verse from Keem.

Composition
The song was described as Drake being "on his rapping shit" and "in flex mode", with a "grungy trap production" and a "triumphant-sounding instrumental". Lyrically, the rapper shows off "grandiose flexes that only he could relate to".

Music video
An accompanying music video was released alongside the single and was directed by Theo Skudra. The video was shot in early March 2021 in Toronto and shows Drake dancing at different sites of the city, including the top of the CN Tower, as well as the TTC Subway and Ripley's Aquarium of Canada.

Commercial performance
The song debuted atop the US Billboard Hot 100 on the chart dated March 20, 2021, dethroning Olivia Rodrigo's "Drivers License" which ruled for eight consecutive weeks. The remaining tracks from the Scary Hours 2 EP, "Wants and Needs" and "Lemon Pepper Freestyle", managed to debut at number two and three, respectively, thus making him the first artist in history to have three songs debut in the top 3 of the Billboard Hot 100.

Personnel
Credits adapted from Tidal.

 Aubrey Graham – lead vocals, songwriting
 Jonathan Priester – songwriting, production
 Maneesh Bidaye – songwriting, production, additional production
 Noah Shebib – mixing, studio personnel
 Noel Cadastre – recording, studio personnel

Charts

Weekly charts

Year-end charts

Certifications

Release history

See also
List of Billboard Hot 100 number ones of 2021

References

2021 singles
2021 songs
Billboard Hot 100 number-one singles
Canadian Hot 100 number-one singles
Drake (musician) songs
OVO Sound singles
Republic Records singles
Songs written by Drake (musician)
Billboard Global 200 number-one singles